The 2018 Macau Open was a badminton tournament which took place at Tap Seac Multisport Pavilion Macau in Macau from 30 October to 4 November 2018 and had a total prize of $150,000.

Tournament
The 2018 Macau Open was the twenty-second tournament of the 2018 BWF World Tour and also part of the Macau Open championships, which had been held since 2006. This tournament was organized by Badminton Federation of Macau and sanctioned by the BWF.

Venue
This international tournament was held at Tap Seac Multisport Pavilion Macau in Macau.

Point distribution
Below is the point distribution table for each phase of the tournament based on the BWF points system for the BWF World Tour Super 300 event.

Prize money
The total prize money for this year's tournament was US$150,000. Distribution of prize money was in accordance with BWF regulations.

Men's singles

Seeds

 Ng Ka Long  (quarter-finals)
 Wong Wing Ki (second round)
 Lee Hyun-il (champion)
 Liew Daren (withdrew)
 Ihsan Maulana Mustofa (withdrew)
 Yu Igarashi (first round)
 Chong Wei Feng (second round)
 Misha Zilberman (second round)

Wild card
Badminton Federation of Macau awarded a wild card entry to Pui Pang Fong of Macau.

Finals

Top half

Section 1

Section 2

Bottom half

Section 3

Section 4

Women's singles

Seeds

 Michelle Li (champion)
 Minatsu Mitani (second round)
 Cheung Ngan Yi (semi-finals)
 Pai Yu-po (second round)
 Han Yue (final)
 Yip Pui Yin (first round)
 Soniia Cheah Su Ya (quarter-finals)
 Zhang Yiman (first round)

Wild card
Badminton Federation of Macau awarded a wild card entry to Ng Weng Chi of Macau.

Finals

Top half

Section 1

Section 2

Bottom half

Section 3

Section 4

Men's doubles

Seeds

 Chen Hung-ling / Wang Chi-lin (quarter-finals)
 Liao Min-chun / Su Ching-heng (second round)
 Han Chengkai / Zhou Haodong (first round)
 Wahyu Nayaka / Ade Yusuf (first round)
 Lu Ching-yao / Yang Po-han (semi-finals)
 Akbar Bintang Cahyono / Muhammad Reza Pahlevi Isfahani (first round)
 Tinn Isriyanet / Tanupat Viriyangkura (first round)
 Mohamad Arif Abdul Latif / Nur Mohd Azriyn Ayub (quarter-finals)

Wild card
Badminton Federation of Macau awarded a wild card entry to Che Pui Ngai / Leong Iok Chong of Macau.

Finals

Top half

Section 1

Section 2

Bottom half

Section 3

Section 4

Women's doubles

Seeds

 Ayako Sakuramoto / Yukiko Takahata (quarter-finals)
 Tang Jinhua / Yu Xiaohan (withdrew)
 Chayanit Chaladchalam / Phataimas Muenwong (first round)
 Nami Matsuyama / Chiharu Shida (semi-finals)

Finals

Top half

Section 1

Section 2

Bottom half

Section 3

Section 4

Mixed doubles

Seeds

 Tang Chun Man / Tse Ying Suet (champions)
 Lee Chun Hei / Chau Hoi Wah (final)
 Chang Tak Ching / Ng Wing Yung (first round)
 Chen Tang Jie / Peck Yen Wei (second round)
 Nipitphon Phuangphuapet / Savitree Amitrapai (quarter-finals)
 Akbar Bintang Cahyono / Winny Oktavina Kandow (semi-finals)
 Alfian Eko Prasetya / Marsheilla Gischa Islami (quarter-finals)
 Chang Ko-chi / Cheng Chi-ya (second round)

Wild card
Badminton Federation of Macau awarded a wild card entry to Che Pui Ngai / Gong Xue Xin of Macau.

Finals

Top half

Section 1

Section 2

Bottom half

Section 3

Section 4

References

External links
 Official Website 
 Tournament Link

Macau Open Badminton Championships
Macau Open (badminton)
Macau Open (badminton)
Macau Open (badminton)
Macau Open (badminton)